Scrobipalpula stirodes is a moth in the family Gelechiidae. It was described by Edward Meyrick in 1931. It is found in Argentina.

References

Scrobipalpula
Moths described in 1931